KJAZ (94.1 FM) is a radio station licensed to Point Comfort, Texas, United States. The license is held by Roy Henderson's S Content Marketing, LLC.  As of December 2008, the station did not have an approved transmitter site and was officially "Silent".

History
According to the FCC history, this station was licensed as KAJI in 1994.  The station acquired the KJAZ callsign on December 14, 2005..

The station's first request to "Remain Silent" occurred in 2001, the first of 13 such requests that the FCC has approved.

References

External links
Current KJAZ station

KJAZ San Francisco
In the Spirit of KJAZ
Spirit of KJAZ Shoutcast
JazzWest - KCSM Scores Old KJAZ Library

JAZ